Jerry Sokolov is a New York City-area trumpet player.  He first trumpeted for Blood, Sweat, and Tears from 1987 to 1994.

References
  http://www.kosmix.com/topic/jerry_sokolov
  Billboard magazine August 4, 2001

Musicians from New York (state)
American trumpeters
American male trumpeters
Living people
21st-century trumpeters
21st-century American male musicians
Year of birth missing (living people)